Hero is a studio album by Clarence Clemons.  Known for his saxophone work with Bruce Springsteen's E Street Band, Clemons released this pop album at the height of Springsteen's popularity following the success of Born in the U.S.A.  It spawned two hit singles, 1985's "You're a Friend of Mine", a duet with Jackson Browne also featuring Browne's then-girlfriend Daryl Hannah on background vocals, and 1986's "I Wanna Be Your Hero".

Track listing

Charts

Personnel
Clarence Clemons - lead vocals, background vocals, saxophone, percussion, cover design
Daryl Hannah - background vocals on "You're a Friend of Mine"
Kitty Beethoven - vocals, background vocals
Princess Loria - vocals, background vocals
Jennifer Hall - vocals, background vocals
Liz Jackson - vocals, background vocals
Brenda Joy Nelson - vocals, background vocals
Sundari - vocals, background vocals
Tina B. - vocals, background vocals
Richard Walsh - vocals, background vocals
Craig Thomas - vocals, background vocals, saxophone
Jackson Browne - vocals, producer on "You're a Friend of Mine"
Lotti Golden - vocals
Darlene Love - vocals
Norman Mershon - vocals
Tony "Rocks" Cowans - guitar, rhythm guitar
Carlos Pepper - guitar, rhythm guitar
Lewis West - guitar, rhythm guitar
Billy Loosigian - guitar, acoustic guitar
Corrado "Rock" Rustici - guitar, acoustic guitar
Vernon "Ice" Black - guitar
Stuart Kimball - guitar
Bobby Messano - guitar
Maurice Starr - bass guitar
John Siegler - bass guitar
Doug Wimbish - bass guitar, drums
Preston "Tiger Head" Glass - acoustic guitar, keyboards, vibraphone
Booker T. Jones - keyboards, organ
Walter Afanasieff - keyboards, sound effects
Frank Martin - keyboards
David Sancious - keyboards
Richard Scher - keyboards
William Beard - drums
Anton Fig - drums
Premik McFly - baritone saxophone, saxophone
Greg Gigi Gonaway - glockenspiel, percussion
Bill Sebastian - glockenspiel, percussion
Randy "The Emperor" Jackson - bass guitar, drums, percussion, sequencing
Michael Rado - harp
Hangsa - choir, chorus
Charles Robin - choir, chorus, vocals, background vocals
Venu - choir, chorus
Yogaloy - choir, chorus
Technical
Gordon Worthy - associate producer, organ, Hammond organ
Narada Michael Walden – producer, arrangements, reduction, keyboards, drums, percussion, bells
Tom Lord-Alge - mixing
Ed Stasium - mixing
Morrie Brown - producer, arrangements on "Cross The Line"
Lloyd Landesman - co-producer on "Cross The Line"
Michael Jonzun - producer on "It's Alright With Me Girl"
Arthur Baker - producer on "The Sun Ain't Gonna Shine Anymore"
George Marino - mastering
Steve Goldman - engineer
Alvin Meyerson - engineer
Tom Moore - engineer
Andy Wallace - engineer
David Frazer - assistant engineer, sound effects
Stuart "Satoshi" Hirotsu - assistant engineer, sound effects
Michael "Patton" Brauer - assistant engineer
Gordon "Wardrobe" Lyon - assistant engineer
Michael Hommel - assistant engineer
Scott Yetka - assistant engineer
Dana Chappelle - assistant engineer
Tim Hatfield - assistant engineer
Geoff Keehn - assistant engineer
Arthur Payson - assistant engineer
Sidney Burton - assistant engineer
Caroline Greyshock - photography
Christopher Austopchuk - art direction

References

External links
 Clarence Clemon's official web site

1985 albums
Clarence Clemons albums
Albums produced by Narada Michael Walden
Albums produced by Arthur Baker (musician)
Albums produced by Michael Jonzun
Columbia Records albums